Belenkovo is a rural locality (a village) in Bolshekochinskoye Rural Settlement, Kochyovsky District, Perm Krai, Russia. The population was 13 as of 2010. There is 1 street.

Geography 
Belenkovo is located 19 km northeast of Kochyovo (the district's administrative centre) by road. Pystogovo is the nearest rural locality.

References 

Rural localities in Kochyovsky District